Penny Lee Dean is an American long distance swimmer who began her career with her swim across frigid San Francisco bay at age 10. Later, as a swimmer for Pomona College, she was a six-time All-American.  By 1976, she had swum from the mainland of California to Catalina Island in the overall world record of 7:15:55 - 1.5 hours under the former record, and a record that still stands.  The next year she set the world record from the island to the mainland on her way to a 50-mile double crossing of the Catalina Channel in 20:03.

Dean is perhaps best known for her world record for the fastest swim across the English Channel in 1978 in a time of 7:40, shattering the previous record by over 1 h and 5 mins. The record stood for both men and women for until September 1995 when it was lowered to 7:17 by Chad Hundeby. 

She continued her long distance swimming career for another three years, winning at Windermere in England, Lake St. John, LaTugue, Lakes Memphremagog and Paspebiac in Quebec, and Atlantic City in New Jersey, setting women's world records in most of them. She was Women's World Professional Champion in 1979 accumulating 1,000 points over her next rival. Dean served as U.S. National Team Coach of Open Water Swimming from 1988 through 1991, Head Coach of U.S. teams to the 1991 Pan Pacific Championships, 1991 World Championships, 1982 and 1990 Windermere Championships, 1990 English Channel Race, 1984 and 1989 Catalina Channel Race and coach of nine solo Catalina Channel crossers. 

Dean was admitted to the International Swimming Hall of Fame in 1996.

Dean was forced to give up competition in the early 1980s, when her doctors urged her to stop all exercise as years of swimming had taken its toll on her body. She taught as a professor of physical education and the women’s swimming and water polo coach at Pomona College for over 25 years.

See also
 List of members of the International Swimming Hall of Fame

References

 Penny Lee Dean, Open Water Swimming, Human Kinetics Publishers, 1998

External links
 Article on Penny from News@Pomona
 Bio of Penny at ISHOF

Place of birth missing (living people)
Living people
American long-distance swimmers
Female long-distance swimmers
English Channel swimmers
Year of birth missing (living people)
Pomona College alumni
Sportspeople from Ithaca, New York
American swimming coaches
Pomona College faculty